Sir William Heygate, 1st Baronet (24 June 1782 – 28 August 1844) was a British politician who served as Lord Mayor of London from 1822 to 1823. He was the first Heygate Baronet of Southend. He was awarded his baronetcy on 15 September 1831 on the occasion of King William IV's Coronation Honours.

He was a Member of Parliament for Sudbury from 1818 to 1826. He also led the public campaign to create Southend Pier. A train on the Southend Pier Railway is named after him. He died in the office of Chamberlain of the City of London, a position he had held since only the previous year.

References

1782 births
1844 deaths
Baronets in the Baronetage of the United Kingdom
Sheriffs of the City of London
19th-century lord mayors of London
19th-century English politicians
Members of the Parliament of the United Kingdom for English constituencies
UK MPs 1818–1820
UK MPs 1820–1826